Marion Township is a civil township of Livingston County in the U.S. state of Michigan. The population was 9,996 at the 2010 census, up from 6,757 at the 2000 census.

Communities
East Marion was the name of a post office here from 1849 until 1856.

Geography
The township is in central Livingston County and is bordered to the northeast by the city of Howell, the county seat. Interstate 96 runs along the northeast edge of the township, with access from Exit 137 (Pinckney Road). I-96 leads southeast  to Detroit and northwest  to Lansing.

The township is part of the watersheds of three different Great Lakes: the eastern side of the township is within the watershed of the South Branch of the Shiawassee River, leading north towards Saginaw Bay on Lake Huron; the western side contains the headwaters of the Red Cedar River, flowing north and west to the Grand River and eventually Lake Michigan; and the southern part of the township is part of the Huron River watershed, leading southeast to Lake Erie.

Demographics
As of the census of 2000, there were 6,757 people, 2,271 households, and 1,925 families residing in the township. The racial makeup of the township was 97.78% White, 0.03% African American, 0.41% Native American, 0.27% Asian, 0.01% Pacific Islander, 0.12% from other races, and 1.38% from two or more races. Hispanic or Latino of any race were 1.04% of the population.

There were 2,271 households, out of which 42.2% had children under the age of 18 living with them, 76.7% were married couples living together, 5.3% had a female householder with no husband present, and 15.2% were non-families. 11.8% of all households were made up of individuals, and 3.7% had someone living alone who was 65 years of age or older.  The average household size was 2.97 and the average family size was 3.22.

In the township the population was spread out, with 29.3% under the age of 18, 5.5% from 18 to 24, 31.6% from 25 to 44, 25.8% from 45 to 64, and 7.8% who were 65 years of age or older.  The median age was 37 years. For every 100 females, there were 102.1 males.  For every 100 females age 18 and over, there were 102.1 males.

The median income for a household in the township was $72,378, and the median income for a family was $76,112. Males had a median income of $57,228 versus $33,101 for females. The per capita income for the township was $26,862.  About 1.0% of families and 2.0% of the population were below the poverty line, including 1.9% of those under age 18 and none of those age 65 or over.

References

Notes

Sources

External links
Official website

Townships in Livingston County, Michigan
Townships in Michigan